Brak Presents the Brak Show Starring Brak is a two-part live-action/animated musical comedy television special that aired on Cartoon Network on February 20, 2000. The special was given a TV-Y7 rating.

History
On July 2, 1999, at the Cartoon Network panel at Dragon Con in Atlanta, Georgia, Andy Merrill, C. Martin Croker, Pete Smith and Nina Bishop announced they were developing a new series starring Brak.

Plot
Brak is the host of a musical variety show while Zorak is trying to sabotage it. The show features celebrity appearances by Monica, Freddie Prinze Jr., The Chieftains, Diamond Dallas Page, and Jo Dee Messina. Grape Ape and Wally Gator make an appearance as well.

Soundtrack

In 2000, The soundtrack Brak Presents the Brak Album Starring Brak was released. The 30 tracks are taken in order from the two "Brak Presents the Brak Show Starring Brak" specials, with the exception of the three bonus tracks and a re-recording of "We're Buds" which was originally a duet between Brak and Jo Dee Messina, but appears on the album with Brak singing both parts.

Track listing
 "Really Cool Song"  (Brak, Wally Gator, Zorak & The Brakettes)  1:19
 "Franz Shoebert"  (Franz Shoebert & The Brakettes)  :46
 "Dentist"  (Wally Gator, Brak & Zorak)  1:18
 "Magic Toenail"  (Brak)  1:25
 "Babbling Brook"  (Brak, Brook & The Chieftains)  :38
 "I'll Tell Me Ma"  (Brak & The Chieftains)  2:10
 "Rock Candy"  (Zorak)  :56
 "Big Fat Squid"  (Grape Ape & The Brakettes)  1:01
 "I Like Hubcaps"  (Brak, Franz Shoebert & The Brakettes)  1:52
 "Cowboy Buddy"  (Cowboy Buddy)  :35
 "Highway 40"  (Brak & Freddie Prinze, Jr.)  2:17
 "Bananachek"  (Brak, Allen Wrench & The Brakettes)  1:10
 "Smell You Later"  (Zorak, Fuzzy & The Brakettes)  1:27
 "Store"  (Brak & The Brakettes)  1:08
 "Brak Counterbrak"  (Brak)  :54
 "Evil Is Only Skin Deep"  (Diamond Dallas Page, Zorak & The Brakettes)  1:35
 "We Like Girls"  (Brak, Zorak & The Brakettes)  1:20
 "El Brakiachi"  (Brak, Zorak & The Brakettes)  1:17
 "Beeflog"  (Brak & Zorak)  1:02
 "Another Cowboy Buddy"  (Cowboy Buddy)  :38
 "Barbeque"  (Brak & Zorak)  :51
 "Count Brakula"  (Brak & Zorak)  1:14
 "I'm Forgettable"  (Brak)  1:19
 "News Bulletin"  (Brak)  :24
 "I'm a Cucumber"  (Brak)  :21
 "News Bulletin"  (Brak)  :27
 "Molly Cule"  (Brak & Zorak)  1:01
 "We're Buds"  (Brak)  2:07
 "Chili Today, Hot Tamale"  (Brak, Zorak & The Brakettes)  1:19
 "Ohio"  (Brak, Wally Gator, Zorak & The Brakettes)  1:25
 "I've Got You Under My Drawers" [*]  (Brak & The Brakettes)  2:13
 "Year of the Mantis" [*]  (Zorak)  :55
 "Soup on a Stick" [*]  (Brak)  1:26

Personnel
 Phil Baron – Executive Producer
 The Brakettes – Performer
 The Braktonics - Performer
 The Chieftains – Performer
 C. Martin Croker - Voice of Zorak & Wally Gator
 Alfreda Gerald – Executive Producer
 Eddie Horst – Director, Executive Producer
 Andy Merrill – Executive Producer, Voice of Brak
 Diamond Dallas Page - Performer
 Freddie Prinze Jr. – Performer
 Dave Rowland – Executive Producer
 Doug Schwartz – Mastering
 Peter Smith – Composer, Producer
 Dale Voelker – Design
 Dave Willis – Executive Producer

See also
 The Brak Show
 Brak (character)
 Space Ghost Coast to Coast

References

External links
 

2000 television specials
Space Ghost Coast to Coast
Television series by Williams Street